Muru is a river in Lom Municipality in Innlandet county, Norway. It originates on the mountain Memurutinden at the glacier Austre Memurubrean and runs through Memurudalen valley and then finally empties into the lake Gjende right next to Memurubu. The river is the primary source for the lake Gjende.

One of the unique aspects of the lake Gjende is that the water has a distinct green color which is the result of glacial runoff containing clay (rock flour).  Looking down towards Memurubu one can see the river Muru coloring the water with a light colored runoff.
 

The river is used for kayaking, however, there is no nearby road access and kayakers must carry their kayaks up the river. Memurubu is a popular starting point for hikers wishing to travel across Besseggen.

See also
List of rivers in Norway

References

External links
 Memurubu mountain lodge

Jotunheimen
Lom, Norway
Rivers of Innlandet